Coatecas Altas  is a town and municipality in Oaxaca in south-western Mexico. The municipality covers an area of 125.03 km2. 
It is part of the Ejutla District in the south of the Valles Centrales Region.

As of 2005, the municipality had a total population of 4,822.

References

Municipalities of Oaxaca